Lui Morais (pen name of Luis Carlos de Morais Junior, also known as Hermes Grau) is a Brazilian hermetic writer,  professor and philosopher, polygraph author of books about philosophy, alchemy, literature, xamanism, Brazilian popular music (samba), movies, management, education, deafness, critics, literature and other matters.
Morais  is married to the writer Eliane Colchete, his partner in several novels and essays.
Morais is also a poet, which can be seen from his book Recycling Poetry (2014) which brings together the pre-classical to postmodern, and mixes languages, with lyrics in Portuguese, English and Spanish, and with the intersection of other languages.

Life 
Morais born in Botafogo, Rio de Janeiro (Brasil), on April 17, 1961. He is the son of radio journalist Luiz Carlos de Morais (Speed Luiz).
He graduated in Portuguese-Greek Letters and Philosophy UERJ, where he specialized in Modern and Contemporary Philosophy and completed his MA in Brazilian Literature in 1992. In 1997 he graduated Doctor of Literature Science at UFRJ, under the guidance of professor Dr. Ana Alencar, and in 2015, did postdoctoral studies at UFRJ. Morais did theater as an actor, director and author. His literature is experimental and thinks philosophically about various subjects.

Works 
 Larápio. Rio de Janeiro: Kroart, 2004.
 Pindorama. Rio de Janeiro: Litteris, 2004.
 Crisólogo – O Estudante de Poesia Caetano Veloso. Rio de Janeiro: HP Comunicação, 2004.
 Proteu ou: A Arte das Transmutações – Leituras, Audições e Visões da Obra de Jorge Mautner. Rio de Janeiro: HP Comunicação, 2004.
 Meutaneurônios Atomizados (with Marcus Vinicius de Medeiros). Rio de Janeiro: t.mais.oito, 2008.
 O Olho do Ciclope e os Novos Antropófagos – Antropofagia Cinematótica na Literatura Brasileira. Rio de Janeiro: Quártica, 2009.
 Y e os Hippies (with Eliane Blener). Rio de Janeiro: Quártica, 2009.
 O Estudante do Coração. Rio de Janeiro: Quártica, 2010.
 O Caminho de Pernambuco (with Eliane Blener). Rio de Janeiro: Quártica, 2010.
 Crisopeia (with Eliane Blener). Rio de Janeiro: Quártica, 2010.
 Clone versus Gólem (with Eliane Blener). Rio de Janeiro: Quártica, 2010.
 O Portal do Terceiro Milênio (with Eliane Colchete). Rio de Janeiro: Quártica, 2011.
 Gigante. Rio de Janeiro: Quártica, 2012.
 O Meteorito dos Homens Ab e Surdos. Rio de Janeiro: Quártica, 2011.
 O Sol Nasceu pra Todos – A História Secreta do Samba. With an introduction by Ricardo Cravo Albin. Rio de Janeiro: Litteris, 2011.
 Proteu ou: A Arte das Transmutações – Leituras, Audições e Visões da Obra de Jorge Mautner. Second Edition: revised and expanded. With 10 interviews with Jorge Mautner. Rio de Janeiro: Litteris, 2011.
 Carlos Castaneda e a Fresta entre os Mundos – Vislumbres da Filosofia Ānahuacah no Século XXI. Rio de Janeiro: Litteris, 2012.
 Natureza Viva. Rio de Janeiro: Quártica, 2012.
 Abobrinhas Requintadas – Exquisite Zucchinis (with Eliane Marques Colchete). Rio de Janeiro: Quártica, 2012.
 Eu Sou o Quinto Beatle. Rio de Janeiro: Quártica, 2012.
 O Homem Secreto. Rio de Janeiro: Quártica, 2013.
 Os que ouvem mais que nós (with Carlos Hilton). Rio de Janeiro: Litteris, 2013.
 Rocambole de Carne a Copacabana (with Cláudio Carvalho and Cid Valle). Rio de Janeiro: Litteris, 2013.
 As Vivências Pós-modernas (et alii). Rio de Janeiro: Quártica, 2013.
 O Estudante do Coração – Ensaios Sobre a Arte Pós-Moderna. Second Edition: revised and expanded. Rio de Janeiro: Litteris, 2013.
 Alquimia o Arquimagistério Solar. Alchimia seu Archimagisterium Solis in V libris. Rio de Janeiro: Quártica Premium, 2013.
 Linhas Cruzadas (with Caio Reis Morais et alii). Rio de Janeiro: Quártica, 2014.
 A Formação da Filosofia Contemporânea (with Eliane Marques Colchete). Rio de Janeiro: Litteris, 2014.
 A Autoeducação e o Século 21. Rio de Janeiro: Litteris, 2014.
 Outras Palavras (with Claudio Carvalho). Rio de Janeiro: Litteris, 2014.
 Poesia de Reciclagem. Rio de Janeiro: Litteris, 2014.
 Encontros nas esquinas das palavras: cinematótica transtemporal e complexistória na lírica brasileira atual ou: impressões de vertigens, ou ainda: devires do soneto brasileiro. Rio de Janeiro: post doctoral book held at the Federal University of Rio de Janeiro. 2015.
 O superprocessador de emoções do aquecimento global {novelo ou: contogeração}. Rio de Janeiro: experimental novel, 2016.
 Laboratório de Letras (redação e interpretação de textos, teoria e história da literatura) (with Eliane Marques Colchete de Morais). Laboratory of Language and Literature. Rio de Janeiro: Quártica, 2017.
 Eu, o dono da verdade. Rio de Janeiro: Quártica, 2017.

References

External links 
 

1961 births
Living people
Brazilian male poets
21st-century Brazilian poets
21st-century Brazilian male writers